Gymnastics events have been staged at the Olympic Games since 1896. Italian female gymnasts have participated in every Summer Olympics since 1928, except for 1932, 1964, and 1980. A total of 80 female gymnasts have represented Italy. Italian women have won one team medal at the Olympics – the 1928 team all-around silver. Vanessa Ferrari earned Italy's first individual medal, a silver on floor exercise, at the 2020 Olympic Games.  Monica Bergamelli, Vanessa Ferrari, and Miranda Cicognani are the only Italian female gymnasts who have competed in at least three Olympics, with Ferrari having competed in four.

Gymnasts

Summer Olympics

Youth Olympic Games

Medalists

References

Italy
G
Olympic